Cauchon is a surname. Notable people with the surname include:

 Pierre Cauchon (1371–1442), bishop of Beauvais
 Joseph-Édouard Cauchon (1816–1885), Canadian politician, physics textbook author, and railroad investor
 Martin Cauchon (born 1962), Canadian lawyer and politician
 Robert Cauchon (1900–1980), Canadian politician